Pastaku is a village in Elva Parish, Valga County in southeastern Estonia. Pastaku has a population of 45 (as of 1 January 2011).

The Tartu–Valga railway passes Pastaku on its western side, but there is no station. The nearest station is located about 4 km southwest in Palupera village.

References

Villages in Valga County